The Vezina Trophy is awarded annually to the National Hockey League's (NHL) goaltender who is "adjudged to be the best at this position". At the end of each season, the thirty-two NHL general managers vote to determine the winner. It is named in honour of Georges Vezina, goaltender of the Montreal Canadiens from 1910 until 1925, who died in 1926 of tuberculosis. The trophy was first awarded after the 1926–27 NHL season and was awarded to the top goaltender.

The most recent winner is Igor Shesterkin of the New York Rangers in the 2021–22 season.

History
The Vezina Trophy was named in honor of Georges Vezina, an exceptional goaltender with the Montreal Canadiens. Vezina collapsed during a game in 1925 and was diagnosed as having tuberculosis, of which he died in 1926. Upon Vezina's death, the trophy was donated to the League by the Canadiens' owners, Leo Dandurand, Louis Letourneau and Joe Cattarinich to honour Vezina permanently. It was first awarded at the end of the 1926–27 NHL season to George Hainsworth who had come to Montreal to succeed Vezina.

The trophy was accepted by the league at its May 15, 1927, meeting in Montreal. The criteria for winning was variously reported. The Montreal Gazette and The Globe and Mail reported that it was 'to be awarded each year to the goaltender in the National Hockey League having the best (goals against) average,' while the Toronto Star reported that the trophy went to the 'most valuable' goaltender in the league. When Hainsworth won his third Vezina at the end of the 1928–29 NHL season, the trophy was reported to be for the 'most outstanding' goaltender in the league. However, later reports state that the trophy was based on the lowest goals against average (GAA).

The Vezina Trophy was quite prestigious, as it was one of the three major personal awards given out by the National Hockey League at the time, along with the Hart Trophy and the Lady Byng Memorial Trophy.

1946 to 1981
In February 1946, the NHL stated that the trophy was to go to the team that allowed the fewest goals during the regular season. The goaltender playing the most games for that team would be awarded the trophy. Manager Tommy Gorman of the Montreal Canadiens stated that if the trophy was awarded to his team, management would decide which of the Habs' two goaltenders (Paul Bibeault and Bill Durnan) would receive the trophy. However, at a banquet that October, NHL President Clarence Campbell indicated that while the league was considering changing the voting methods of the Calder, Hart, and Lady Byng Trophies, the criteria for the Vezina were not changing.

Since it was common for goaltenders to start every game before 1950, the Vezina usually went to the goaltender with the lowest personal goals against average in the league; however, there were two notable exceptions. Hainsworth's Canadiens allowed fewer goals as a team than Benedict's Maroons.

As teams started to use more than one goaltender in a season regularly, it became increasingly common for the goaltender with the lowest GAA not to be a member of the team that allowed the fewest goals.

The National Hockey League began allowing teammates to split the Vezina Trophy following the 1964–65 NHL season. The Toronto Maple Leafs allowed 173 goals against (0 empty net goals), barely beating out Detroit's 175 goals against (3 empty net goals), and Chicago's 176 goals against (3 empty net goals). Toronto Terry Sawchuk played 36 games for the Leafs with a GAA of 2.56, while his teammate Johnny Bower played 34 games with a league-leading GAA of 2.38, but Sawchuk was to be the sole winner under the old criteria. During the season, the two agreed to split the $1000 prize money that came with the trophy if either of them won. At the end of the season, Sawchuk publicly stated that he would refuse the trophy if Bower would not also have his name inscribed. The NHL subsequently changed the rule to allow any goaltender on the team who allowed the fewest goals against to qualify for the Vezina if he played at least 25 games, and applied this rule retroactively to Sawchuk and Bower. This criterion was in place until .

The Vezina criteria had the trophy going to the goaltender(s) of the team that was best at preventing goals, not necessarily the best individual goaltender of the year. The best goaltender, as voted by the media, was the NHL first team All-Star. These often differed, such as in  when Don Edwards and Bob Sauve shared the Vezina while Tony Esposito was named to the First Team. During the 1973–74 NHL season, the Chicago Black Hawks and Philadelphia Flyers finished tied for the fewest goals against; therefore their respective goaltenders, Tony Esposito and Bernie Parent, were both awarded the trophy, the only time that it would be shared between two players from different teams. For 1973–74 the media voted Parent a First Team All-Star and Esposito a Second Team All-Star.  Glenn Hall, who played for Detroit, Chicago and St. Louis during his career, was voted the First Team All-Star goaltender the most times of any goaltender, seven times, but only won the Vezina Trophy as the goaltender on the team allowing the fewest goals against three times.  By contrast, Jacques Plante, was awarded the Vezina Trophy seven times, six of those when with the very dominant Montreal Canadiens of the 1950s and 1960s, but was voted as the First Team All-Star only three times.  Plante's seventh Vezina Trophy was shared with Hall as they shared goaltending duties for the St. Louis Blues in 1968–69 when that team allowed the fewest goals in the league; Hall was voted as the First Team All-Star that year.

1981 to the present
As of the 1981–82 NHL season, the Vezina Trophy has been given to the most outstanding goaltender as voted by the general managers of the NHL teams. Billy Smith of the New York Islanders was the first winner of the Vezina under the current system. The William M. Jennings Trophy, given to the goaltender(s) who play(s) a minimum of 25 games for the team that allows the fewest goals, serves the function of the old Vezina.

The voting is conducted at the end of the regular season by the 32 general managers of the teams in the National Hockey League, with all individual voters ranking their top three candidates on a 5–3–1 points system. Three finalists are named and the trophy is awarded at the NHL Awards ceremony after the playoffs.

Records and distinctions
Jacques Plante holds the record for winning the most Vezinas with seven, followed by Bill Durnan and Dominik Hasek, who have won six each. Hasek has won the most awards under the current criterion of voting for the best individual goalie. Players for the Montreal Canadiens have won the Vezina 29 times.

Two other goaltenders have won the Vezina and Hart trophies in separate seasons: Roy Worters (Hart , Vezina ) and Al Rollins (Vezina , Hart ). Chuck Rayner is the only goaltender who has won the Hart Memorial Trophy (which he did in ) but never won the Vezina Trophy.

Winners

1927–81

When introduced, the Vezina Trophy was awarded to the top goaltender in the league. Several winners, including Hainsworth in 1927 and Gardiner in 1934, did not have the lowest goals-against average. In 1946, the NHL Governors further clarified the criteria for winning. It was to go to the team with the fewest goals scored against it during the season. The goalie playing the most games for the team was awarded the trophy. In 1965, the NHL Governors began allowing teammates to share the Vezina Trophy. From 1965 to 1981, the Vezina was awarded to any goaltenders who played 25 or more games for the team allowing the fewest goals against.

1981–present
The NHL adopted the current criteria for the Vezina Trophy beginning in 1981–82. The William M. Jennings Trophy was created as a new award for the goaltender(s) playing 25 or more games for the team allowing the fewest goals against.

See also
 List of National Hockey League awards
 List of NHL players
 List of NHL statistical leaders
 William M. Jennings Trophy

References

General
Vezina Trophy history at Legends of Hockey.net
Vezina Trophy at NHL.com
Vezina Trophy voting history at The Goaltender Home Page - complete voting history from 1981 to 1982 (when the award switched to a voting criterion) to present.
Specific

National Hockey League trophies and awards
Awards established in 1926